Stahnsdorf is a municipality in the Potsdam-Mittelmark district, in Brandenburg, Germany.

Geography
Neighbouring municipalities are the town of Teltow in the east and Kleinmachnow in the north, both immediately bordering the Berlin city limits.

The municipal area is bound by the Teltow Canal in the north. It comprises Stahnsdorf proper and the villages of Güterfelde, Schenkenhorst, and Sputendorf.

History
Stahnsdorf in the Margraviate of Brandenburg was first documented in a 1264 purchase contract of Margrave Otto III and the Brandenburg bishop. It originally consisted only of its old village green on a formerly important merchant road from Leipzig in Saxony via Güterfelde and Stahnsdorf, crossing the Bäke creek (the present-day Teltow Canal) at Kleinmachnow, and running northwards to Spandau.

With the construction of the Teltow Canal in the early 20th century, the opening of the large Southwest Cemetery in April 1909, the Wilmersdorfer Waldfriedhof and Friedenauer Waldfriedhof in 1913, and the opening of the S-Bahn route from Berlin-Wannsee station in June 1913 the development in a Berlin suburb began. In the following decades, the current site was created by the development of privately owned homes, the connection to Berlin-Lichterfelde by a tram and building a settlement for workers at the Bosch manufactures in Kleinmachnow.

In 1920 the Stahnsdorf Military Cemetery was formalised. It contains 1175 graves, mainly of British POWs who died in captivity. It was designed by Sir Robert Lorimer.

1931 Stahnsdorf WWTP was put into operation, where waste water from the south of Berlin was treated. It was one of the first plants to produce biogas.

The construction of the Berlin Wall on 13 August 1961 severed the connections to the bordering Berlin. In the communist era, the place was dominated economically, especially through the semiconductor business as a major operation and farms. The fall of the Berlin Wall set a renewing development by inflows, opening new home communities, and in recent years by commercial development, particularly in "Green Park", a large industrial park.

On 1 January 2002 Stahnsdorf in its present form was formed by the incorporation of the towns Güterfelde, Schenkenhorst and Sputendorf.

Demography

Politics

Seats in the municipal assembly (Gemeindevertretung) as of 2014 local elections:
Bürger für Bürger (Independent): 7
Christian Democratic Union of Germany (CDU): 5
Social Democratic Party of Germany (SPD): 3
Wir Vier (Independent): 2
Alliance '90/The Greens: 2
The Left: 2
Alternative for Germany (AfD): 1

Sports
Stahnsdorf is one of the three home towns of the basketball team TKS 49ers.

References

External links

Official website of Stahnsdorf
Stahnsdorf South-Western Cemetery
Official website of the Stahnsdorf Voluntary Fire Department

Localities in Potsdam-Mittelmark
Teltow (region)